Metropolitan areas were recognized by the government of the Republic of China (Taiwan) until 2010. This was the definition of metropolitan areas used by the ROC central government.
 A metropolitan area is an economically and socially integrated area with one or more core cities. The population has to be over 300,000.
 Core city: A core city has to satisfy the following three conditions:
 Its population more than 200,000.
 More than 70% of its residents living in the urbanized area.
 More than 70% of the employed residents working within the city.
 Satellite city: Within the same region of the core city, a city or township is defined as a satellite city if one of the following conditions is satisfied. A satellite city has to connect to the core city either directly or through its satellite cities.
 More than 10% of the employed residents commuting to the core city.
 More than 5% of the employed residents commuting to the core city and more than 40% of the residents living within the same urbanized area as the core city.
 surrounded by satellite cities.
 If a city is qualified to be a satellite city for more than one core cities, it is defined to be of the core city with more commuters.
 A metropolitan area is named after the most populous core city.
 Two metropolitan areas are combined into one if the distance between the largest core cities is less than 25 km or if they are bordered with each other for more than 1 km, and if there is close connection of their commuters.

Metropolitan areas in Taiwan

Seven metropolitan areas were identified in Taiwan.

External links
Sustainable urban planning
 Government Statistics website (in Chinese)
Construction and Planning Agency - Engaged in comprehensive plans, urban planning, public housing, construction management, public works, building new business.
Geopolis : research group, university of Paris-Diderot, France — Urbanization in the world

 
Taiwan
Metropolitan areas